Negin Altooni (born 1 March 2001) is an Iranian karateka. She won bronze medal at the 2018 Summer Youth Olympics, and won gold medal at the Youth Asian karate championships 2018 Japan She also finished third in the Croatia 2018 Youth Karate1 League Championship and Earned the Youth Olympics quota.

Achievements

See also 
Karate at the 2018 Summer Youth Olympics
Hamideh Abbasali
Sajad Ganjzadeh
Mohammad Ali Khosravi

External links 
Altooni on wkf federation website
olympic 2018 Buenos Aires result in the AKF website
Altooni's All tournament results in the IKF website
Negin Altooni on instagram
Negin Altooni on Facebook
Negin Altooni on Twitter
Negin Altooni on YouTube

References

Iranian female karateka
2001 births
Living people
Karateka at the 2018 Summer Youth Olympics
People from Ilam Province
21st-century Iranian women